Mr. Meaty is a teen sitcom created by Jamie Shannon and Jason Hopley. The show centers on two lazy teenage boys, Josh Redgrove and Parker Dinkleman, who work at a fast food restaurant called Mr. Meaty inside a shopping mall as they often encounter supernatural and bizarre situations. The series is set in the fictional town of Scaunchboro, based on Scarborough, Toronto.

Mr. Meaty originated as a series of 17 shorts that appeared as interstitials on Nickelodeon in the United States and CBC Television in Canada. A pilot episode featuring material from the shorts aired on December 30, 2005. The series officially premiered on September 22, 2006, and continued to air until May 23, 2009. It ended with a total of two seasons and twenty episodes, three of which are 22-minute specials.

Premise
Mr. Meaty centers on a pair of teenage boys working at a fast-food restaurant established in the fictional Scaunchboro Mall: the nerdy, gluttonous, awkward Parker Dinkleman (Jason Hopley) and the charming, popular, but uncaring and self-centered Josh Redgrove (Jamie Shannon). The boys are often placed in bizarre, supernatural or grotesque situations. They are also seen dealing with common teenage situations such as dating and peer pressure.

Characters

 Josh Redgrove (Jamie Shannon), a 16–year-old who works as a cashier for Mr. Meaty
 Parker Dinkleman (Jason Hopley), a 15-year-old who works as a fry cook for Mr. Meaty
 Doug (Todd Doldersum), Scaunchboro Mall's beefy mall cop with a macho attitude.
 Edward R. Carney (Marty Stelnick), Mr. Meaty's 109-year-old founder and CEO who was previously cryogenically frozen.
 Mr. Wink (Troy Baker), the cold-hearted manager of Mr. Meaty.

Voices

Production
Mr. Meaty began as a series of shorts that played between longer programs on Nickelodeon from 2002 to 2005. They were also featured on CBC's variety show The Void, on Nickelodeon's iTunes listings, and on the TurboNick website. The show was Shannon and Hopley's second production for Nickelodeon after Nanalan', as well as the Disney Junior series Ooh, Aah & You.

Neither of the series' creators had worked at a fast food restaurant prior to creating the show. However, Hopley had once worked at a movie theater's concessions stand, which gave him inspiration for some of the ideas in the show. He has also cited The Ren & Stimpy Show as a source of inspiration for the show's style of humor.

The show was created specifically for a teenage audience; of the target age group, executive producer Jack Lenz said, "Entertaining kids in their teens is not easy and it takes a very strong concept to catch on with this demographic. Mike Judge clearly nailed it with Beavis and Butt-Head and we believe that Mr. Meaty will do the same."

Nickelodeon commissioned a season of full-length episodes around September 2005. An 11-minute pilot titled "In Parker's Sight" aired on December 30, 2005. It was a retrospective featuring material from the earlier shorts. On September 22, 2006, the series made its official debut on Nickelodeon. The episode "Buffalo Burrito" had been released as a sneak peek on the iTunes Store two days earlier on September 18. The series moved to Nickelodeon's sister channel Nicktoons on February 23, 2007. Nicktoons aired the remaining episodes from March 10, 2007, to May 23, 2009.

Episodes

Series overview

Pilot (2005)

Season 1 (2006–2007)

Season 2 (2008–2009)

Home media

Reception
Common Sense Media gave the series a rating of 3/5, stating that the humor was geared toward older children and noting that some viewers "will enjoy the idiosyncratic characters and their attempts to survive the uncertainties of puberty." Susan Stewart of The New York Times gave the show a positive review, calling its puppetry "a perfect medium for sending up the foibles of the teenage years" and commending the two main characters' "deft characterizations".

In May 2007, the show ranked as the fourth highest-rated Saturday morning program among children aged 2―11.

References

External links
 

2000s Nickelodeon original programming
2000s American horror comedy television series
2000s American satirical television series
2000s American teen sitcoms
2000s American workplace comedy television series
2005 American television series debuts
2009 American television series endings
2000s Canadian satirical television series
2000s Canadian teen sitcoms
2000s Canadian workplace comedy television series
2005 Canadian television series debuts
2009 Canadian television series endings
American television shows featuring puppetry
Canadian horror comedy television series
Canadian television shows featuring puppetry
English-language television shows
Interstitial television shows
CBC Television original programming
Television series about teenagers
Television shows set in Ontario
Television shows filmed in Toronto